Michael Shragge is a Canadian luger. He competed in the men's singles and doubles events at the 1976 Winter Olympics.

References

Year of birth missing (living people)
Living people
Canadian male lugers
Olympic lugers of Canada
Lugers at the 1976 Winter Olympics
Place of birth missing (living people)